This is a list of articles about swimming in each country around the world.  Most countries have two national championships per year, one in long course and one in short course. Some countries also have a national team championship.

References

Swimming
Swimming-related lists
Swimming